Amélékia is a town in eastern Ivory Coast. It is a sub-prefecture of Abengourou Department in Indénié-Djuablin Region, Comoé District.

Amélékia was a commune until March 2012, when it became one of 1126 communes nationwide that were abolished.

The government of the Ivory Coast is trying to merge different municipalities and communes in their attempt to increase urbanization and reduce bureaucracy and costs of administration.
 
In 2014, the population of the sub-prefecture of Amélékia was 25,238.

Villages
The nine villages of the sub-prefecture of Amélékia and their population in 2014 are:
 Amélékia  (8 634)
 Ameakro  (1 529)
 Anougbakro  (2 904)
 Elinso (2 961)
 Koitienkro  (2 338)
 Konan Konankro  (1 537)
 Kouadiokro  (599)
 Tahakro  (1 928)
 Zebenou  (2 808)

References

Sub-prefectures of Indénié-Djuablin
Former communes of Ivory Coast